Hamaari Beti Raaj Karegi is an Indian television drama series that aired on Sahara One channel. The series is premiered on 20 December 2010 . The series stars  Saira Banu.

Plot 
Binaifer Kohli and Sanjay Kohli, Producers, Edit II Productions, "Hamaari Beti Raaj Karegi portrays the dream of every father of getting his daughter married in the best of family, hoping that she will live a queen’s life and rule the household."

Cast 

Akanksha Juneja as Anjali Shukla
Ravi Bhatia as Nirbhay
Shashank Sharma as Vikram 
Debashish Nah as Uma Shankar Shukla
Kavita Magare as JYOTI
Shekhar Sharma as Shashidhar Chaturvedi
Shagufta Ali as Taiji

References

Bepanah

External links
Hamaari Beti Raaj Karegi Official Site on Sahara One
Contest of Hamaari Beti Raaj Karegi
Facebook

Sahara One original programming
Indian drama television series
2010 Indian television series debuts
2011 Indian television series endings